Nordsida Church is a parish church of the Church of Norway in Stryn Municipality in Vestland county, Norway. It is located in the village of Roset, on the northern shore of the Nordfjorden. It is the church for the Nordsida parish which is part of the Nordfjord prosti (deanery) in the Diocese of Bjørgvin. The white, concrete church was built in a long church design in 1973 using plans drawn up by the architect Alf Apalseth. The church seats about 220 people.

History
During the 1920s, the people on the north side of the Innvik Church parish began asking for their own church on their side of the fjord. Strife and negotiations of this idea carried on for decades. After World War II, political changes ensued in the local municipalities. In 1965, the old Hornindal municipality was divided and a large portion of it was added to Stryn municipality. After some negotiations, approval for the new Nordsida Chapel was given. The new chapel would be an annex chapel under Hornindal Church. The architect Alf Apalseth from Ørsta made the architectural drawings for the new church building and Kjell Sigmar Slinning designed the interior of the church. The church was completed in 1973. The building was consecrated on 9 December 1973 by the Bishop Per Juvkam. In 1977, the part of Stryn that used to be Hornindal municipality was separated from Stryn municipality again. On 1 July 1981, Nordsida Chapel was renamed as a church and it became a full parish church.

See also
List of churches in Bjørgvin

References

Stryn
Churches in Vestland
Long churches in Norway
Concrete churches in Norway
20th-century Church of Norway church buildings
Churches completed in 1973
1973 establishments in Norway